Ward Park is a public, urban park in Raymore, Missouri, United States. Located on 3.88 acres on the western end of Sierra Drive in Ward Park Place subdivision, Ward Park received playground equipment and a paved walking trail in 2011. Currently, this park is closed as a part of the continuing efforts to slow the spread of the Coronavirus COVID-19. It is part of the Kansas City metropolitan area.

References

Urban public parks
Parks in Cass County, Missouri
Tourist attractions in Raymore, Missouri